is a Japanese idol singer, and a member of the idol group Shiritsu Ebisu Chugaku.

Mayama performed one of the opening themes for the 2014 anime television series Akame ga Kill! ("Liar Mask", featured in episodes 15 and on). The song is a mix of J-pop and heavy metal.

Discography 
 See also Shiritsu Ebisu Chugaku § Discography.

Solo singles

Appearances

Anime 
 Nanana's Buried Treasure (May — June, 2014, Fuji TV), Shizuka Kisaragi
 Akame ga Kill! (November 16, 2014, Tokyo MX), handmaiden

References

External links 
 
 Rika Mayama profile on the Stardust Promotion website
  — Rika Mayama's video introduction, recorded in 2011 for Kawaii Girl Japan

Shiritsu Ebisu Chugaku members
1967 births
Living people
Japanese women pop singers
Japanese idols

Japanese voice actresses
Singers from Tokyo
21st-century Japanese singers
21st-century Japanese actresses
21st-century Japanese women singers